Porsild is a surname, and may refer to:
Anntonia Porsild, Thai-Danish model, actress and beauty pageant titleholder 
Morten Pedersen Porsild (1872–1956), Danish botanist
Erling Porsild, Danish-Canadian botanist